Hector Nicolas Alphonse Marie France (1837–1908) was a French writer and soldier, the author of numerous stories of an erotic nature. Has also translated from English into French and from French into English. He sometimes collaborated with Hugues Rebell (alias Georges Grassal) and Charles Carrington under the collective pseudonym Jean de Villiot.

Life 
Hector France was born on 5 July 1837 at Mirecourt. He was present at the rout in Algeria in 1870. He returned to France and became a member and an officer of the Paris Commune but was deported in 1872, taking up a secondary career as a writer. He died on 19 August 1908 in Rueil-Malmaison, aged seventy-one.

Appraisal 
France was by profession a soldier, and wrote ably on military and economic subjects, as John Bull's Army (1887) and several pamphlets evince. His fictions show a loving care of form and effect, also a delight in dwelling on painful and revolting aspects of passion. The Pastor's Romance (1879); Love in the Blue Country (1880); and Sister Kuhnegunde's Sins (1880), exemplify both. 

In 1881 he published his most famous work, Sous le Burnous, which included some illustrations by Édouard-Henri Avril. The play was translated into English by Alfred Allinson as Musk, Hashish and Blood (1900).

Works 

 L'Amour au pays bleu (Paris: Alphonse Lemerre, 1880; 291 pages)
 Le Péché de sœur Cunégonde (Paris: Chauvin, 1880; 483 pages)
 Les Cent Curés paillards (Paris: Librairie du progrès, 1883)
 Marie Queue-de-Vache (Paris: Librairie du progrès, 1883; 481 pages)
 Les Va-nu-pieds de Londres (Paris: G. Charpentier & Co., 1883; 332 pages)
 Le Roman du curé (Paris: Henri Oriol, 1884; 452 pages)
 La Pudique Albion. Les Nuits de Londres (Paris: G. Charpentier & Co., 1885)
 Sous le burnous (Paris: G. Charpentier & Co., 1886; 333 pages); reissue (Toulouse: Anacharsis, 2011)
 L'Armée de John Bull (Paris: G. Charpentier & Co., 1887; 344 pages)
 Ketty Culbute [followed by] La Révolte des Tramps [and] La Gigue d'Ève (Brussels: Messageries de le Presse, 1887; 12 pages)
 Sac au dos à travers l'Espagne (Paris: G. Charpentier & Co., 1888, 320 pages)
 La Vierge russe (Paris: H. Geffroy, 1893, 800 pages)
 Dictionnaire de la langue verte. Archaïsmes, néologismes, locutions étrangères, patois (Paris: Librairie du progrès, 1890; 495 pages
 Roman d'une jeune fille pauvre (Paris: H. Geffroy, 1896; 1763 pages)
 Les Mystères du monde… [continuation and end of Mystères du peuple by Eugène Sue] (Paris: Maurice Lachâtre, 1898; 800 pages)
 L'Outrage (Paris: H. Geffroy, 1900; 968 pages)
 Croquis d'outre-Manche (Paris: Eugène Fasquelle, 1900; 293 pages)
 Au pays de Cocagne, principauté de Monaco (Paris: Eugène Fasquelle, 1902; 297 pages)
 Musk, Hashish and Blood (Paris: Charles Carrington, 1902; 447 pages)
 Le Beau Nègre: roman de mœurs sud-américaines (Paris: C. Carrington, 1902; 414 pages)
 La Fille du garde-chasse (Paris: H. Geffroy, 1903; 1544 pages)
 Un Parisien en Sibérie. Part One, Le Tueur de Cosaques (Paris: A.-L. Guyot, 1906; 187 pages)

References

Citations

Bibliography 

 Maitron, Jean and Pennetier, Claude, eds. (2006). "FRANCE Hector (FRANCE Nicolas, Alphonse, Marie, Hector)". In Le Maitron: Dictionnaire biographique, mouvement ouvrier, mouvement social. Maitron.fr. Retrieved 2 April 2022.
 Ayres, H. M., ed. (1917). "Hector France (1837–1908)". In The Reader's Dictionary of Authors. New York: Warner Library Co. 
 "Hector France (1837-1908)". (2022). BnF Data. Bibliothèque nationale de France. Retrieved 2 April 2022.
 "Hector France". (2021). The British Museum. Retrieved 2 April 2022.

External links 

 Ockerbloom, John Mark, ed. (2001). "France, Hector, 1837-1908". The Online Books Page. Retrieved 2 April 2022.

 
1837 births
1908 deaths
19th-century French writers